Oslen Barr (born 3 April 1961) is a Guyanese former middle distance runner who competed in the 1984 Summer Olympics and in the 1988 Summer Olympics.

References

1961 births
Living people
Guyanese male middle-distance runners
Olympic athletes of Guyana
Athletes (track and field) at the 1984 Summer Olympics
Athletes (track and field) at the 1988 Summer Olympics
Athletes (track and field) at the 1982 Commonwealth Games
Commonwealth Games competitors for Guyana
Athletes (track and field) at the 1983 Pan American Games
Pan American Games competitors for Guyana
Competitors at the 1986 Central American and Caribbean Games
Central American and Caribbean Games gold medalists for Guyana
Central American and Caribbean Games medalists in athletics
20th-century Guyanese people